Alm is a Swedish surname that may refer to
 Alvin L. Alm (1937–2000), administrator at the American Environmental Protection Agency
 Andreas Alm (born 1973), Swedish association football player
 Chuck Alm (born 1937), American rower
Clara Alm (born 1996), Swedish footballer 
 Eivor Alm (1924–2011), Swedish cross-country skier
 Ernst Alm (1900–1980), Swedish cross-country skier
 Immanuel Alm (1767–1809), Finnish painter
 James Alm (born 1950), American economist
 Jeff Alm (1968–1993), American football player
 Jenny Alm (born 1989), Swedish handball player
 Johan Alm (1728–1810), Finnish painter and field sergeant
 Johan Alm (ice hockey) (born 1992), Swedish ice hockey defenceman
 John R. Alm (born 1945), American businessman, former president and Chief Executive Officer for Coca-Cola Enterprises
 Josef Alm (1889–1957), Swedish weapon historian
 Kerstin Alm (born 1949), politician of the autonomous Åland Islands
 Knut Alm (1889–1969), Swedish runner
 Maja Alm (born 1988), Danish orienteering competitor
Steve Alm (born 1953/54), Prosecuting Attorney of Honolulu

Swedish-language surnames